Timote Moleni (born 27 June 1975) is a former Tongan footballer who played as a midfielder. Moleni was appointed head coach of Tonga in 2015.

In 2012 he managed the Tonga national under-23 football team for the 2012 OFC Men's Olympic Qualifying Tournament. In 2013 he managed the under-17 team for the 2013 OFC U-17 Championship. In 2015 he managed the national team for the world cup qualifiers. He has also managed Veitongo FC in the Tonga Major League and OFC Champions League.

References 

Living people
1975 births
Tongan footballers
Tonga international footballers

Association football midfielders